Ivan Stepanovich Martynushkin (born 23 December 1923) is a Russian World War II veteran and the last surviving liberator of the Auschwitz concentration camp, after the death of David Dushman in 2021.

References 

1923 births
Living people
People from Rybnovsky District
People from Ryazansky Uyezd
Soviet military personnel of World War II
Recipients of the Order of the Red Banner